The Roman Catholic Archdiocese of Arusha is the Metropolitan See for the Ecclesiastical province of Arusha in Tanzania.

History
Roman Catholic Archdiocese of Arusha is among 34 Dioceses of Catholic Church of Tanzania, which are practising Roman rite. According to history, evangelisation in Arusha started in July 15, 1926 when Holy Ghost Fathers Missionaries from Kilimanjaro were invited to visit Arusha. At that moment Arusha  was the part of Kilimanjaro Vicariate. These priests arrived in Arusha and opened Mission in an area known as Mesopotamia.The Mission centre of Mesopotamia was developed slowly into a Parish, which is known as St Theresa of Child Jesus Parish.

 March 1, 1963: Established as Diocese of Arusha from the Diocese of Moshi 
 March 16, 1999: Promoted as Metropolitan Archdiocese of Arusha

Special churches

The seat of the archbishop is St. Theresa’s Metropolitan Cathedral in Arusha.

Bishops
 Bishops of Arusha (Roman rite)
 Bishop Dennis Vincent Durning, C.S.Sp. (1963.03.01 – 1989.03.06)
 Bishop Fortunatus M. Lukanima (1989.03.06 – 1998.07.20)
 Bishop Josaphat Louis Lebulu (1998.11.28 – 1999.03.16); see below
 Metropolitan Archbishops of Arusha (Roman rite)
 Archbishop Josaphat Louis Lebulu (1999.03.16 - 2017.12.27); see above
 Archbishop Isaac Amani Massawe (2017.12.27 - )

Auxiliary Bishop
Prosper Balthazar Lyimo (2014-)

Suffragan dioceses
 Mbulu
 Moshi
 Same

See also
Roman Catholicism in Tanzania
List of Roman Catholic dioceses in Tanzania

Sources
 GCatholic.org

References

Arusha
Arusha
Arusha